The Blacklick Valley School District is a diminutive, rural pupil school district located in Cambria County, Pennsylvania. The district serves the communities of:  Nanty-Glo and Vintondale and Blacklick Township. According to 2010 federal census data, the district's population declined to 5,161 people. Per the 2000 federal census data, Blacklick Valley School District served a resident population of 5,782. The educational attainment levels for the Blacklick Valley School District population (25 years old and over) were 85.6% high school graduates and 12.8% college graduates. The district is one of the 500 public school districts of Pennsylvania.

According to the Pennsylvania Budget and Policy Center, 55.8% of the district's pupils lived at 185% or below the Federal Poverty level as shown by their eligibility for the federal free or reduced price school meal programs in 2012. In 2009, the district residents’ per capita income was $13,979, while the median family income was $36,199. In the Commonwealth, the median family income was $49,501 and the United States median family income was $49,445, in 2010. In Cambria County, the median household income was $39,547. By 2013, the median household income in the United States rose to $52,100.

History
The school district was established in 1967, merging the Blacklick Township and Vintondale School Districts.

Schools

 Blacklick Valley Jr.-Sr. High555 Birch StreetNanty-Glo, Pennsylvania 15943
 Blacklick Valley Elementary Center1000 Railroad StreetNanty-Glo, Pennsylvania 15943

High school students may choose to attend Admiral Peary Vocational-Technical School for training in the construction and mechanical trades. The Appalachia Intermediate Unit IU8 provides the district with a wide variety of services like specialized education for disabled students and hearing, speech and visual disability services and professional development for staff and faculty.

Extracurriculars
Blacklick Valley School District offers a wide variety of clubs, activities and an extensive, publicly funded sports program.

Sports
The school district provides:
Varsity

Boys
 Football - Class A
 Basketball - Class A
 Baseball - Class A
 Track and Field - Class AA

Girls
 Basketball - Class A
 Softball - Class A
 Track and Field - Class AA

Junior High Middle School Sports

Boys
Basketball
Football
Girls
Basketball

According to PIAA directory June 2015

References

External links
 Blacklick Valley School District
 Penna. Interscholastic Athletic Assn.

School districts in Cambria County, Pennsylvania
1967 establishments in Pennsylvania
School districts established in 1967